Maryevka is a rural locality (a selo) in Progressovskoye Rural Settlement, Paninsky District, Voronezh Oblast, Russia. The population was 122 as of 2010. There are 3 streets.

Geography 
Maryevka is located 18 km southeast of Panino (the district's administrative centre) by road. Nikolskoye is the nearest rural locality.

References 

Rural localities in Paninsky District